Dynamite is the sixth studio album by English funk and acid jazz band Jamiroquai. It was released on 15 June 2005 in Japan, 20 June 2005 in the United Kingdom, 21 July 2005 in Australia and 20 September 2005 in the United States.

Album information
The album was released after the 2004 film Napoleon Dynamite featured the Jamiroquai song "Canned Heat" in its climactic dance scene. "Feels Just Like It Should" was the first single, reaching No. 8 in its first week on the UK charts. It has since become a No. 1 hit on the Billboard dance charts in the United States. The single was also certified Gold in Japan for selling 100,000 copies. The second single, "Seven Days in Sunny June", was released in the UK in August 2005, peaking at No. 14 on the UK Singles Chart. The song also features in the film The Devil Wears Prada. On 7 November 2005, "(Don't) Give Hate A Chance" was released as the third single from the album.  The politically driven video for the track was Jamiroquai's first animated clip; it features a Buffalo Man, complete with buffalo-horned hat, sunglasses, and tracksuit. The clip helped the track score Top 20 showings in UK charts such as the Smash Hits and Hit40UK charts, both of which take in radio and video airplay as well as sales. The track reached No. 27 on the official UK Singles Chart. The album was recorded in many locations, including singer Jay Kay's personal Chillington Studios.

Reception

The album peaked at No. 3 in the United Kingdom, becoming the first Jamiroquai album to chart outside the top two spots. Uncut gave the album 3 out of 5 stars, claiming "Jay Kay returns with another blast of super-slick soul". Vibe wrote that "The space cowboys return with a vengeance, sounding funky as ever."

Track listing

 Japanese bonus track
 13. "Feels So Good" (Knee Deep Remix Edit) – 3:42

 DualDisc
 "Dynamite in Enhanced Stereo" – 54:59
 "Feels Just Like It Should" (video) – 4:34
 "Seven Days in Sunny June" (video) – 3:59
 "Feels Just Like It Should" (The Making Of) – 22:59

 Australian tour edition bonus disc
 "Don't Give Hate a Chance" (Steve Mac Classic Remix)
 "Don't Give Hate a Chance" (Freemasons Remix)
 "Don't Give Hate a Chance" (Freemasons Dub)
 "Seven Days in Sunny June" (Ashley Beedle Heavy Disco Dub)
 "Seven Days in Sunny June" (Kraak & Smaak Remix)
 "Seven Days in Sunny June" (Blackbeard Remix)
 "Feels Just Like It Should" (Mark Ronson Remix 2)
 "Feels Just Like It Should" (Timo Maas Remix)

Note: "Time Won't Wait" was not on the initial European and Australian release; in most regions, it was later added as a standard track. Additionally, some CD-r promos of the album include the track "Beatbox" (0:34) as Track 12.

Personnel
Adapted credits from the liner notes of Dynamite.
Jamrioquai
Jay Kay – lead vocals (all tracks), backing vocals (tracks 1-3, 6, 10-11), synthetic bass vocals (1), backing vocal arrangements (2, 4-8, 12)
Rob Harris – guitar (tracks 1-8, 10-12)
Matt Johnson – keyboards (1-6, 8, 10-12), piano (tracks 5, 8-9, 12), synthesizer bass (6), Fender Rhodes piano (7)
Derrick McKenzie – drums (tracks 1, 3, 5-6, 8, 10-12), additional hi hat percussion (2)
Sola Akingbola – percussion (tracks 1, 3, 5, 10, 12)
Additional musicians
Alex Meadows – bass (tracks 2, 10)
Derrick McIntyre – bass (tracks 3, 5, 8, 12) additional bass (11)
Randy Hope-Taylor – bass (track 7), additional bass (8)
Miaer Lloyd aka DJ Snare – scratch DJ (track 6)
Nathan Haines – flute, saxophone (track 7)
Benjamin Wright – string section leader (tracks 5, 7-9, 12), string arrangements (5, 7-9, 12), brass section leader (12), brass arrangements (12)
Mike Spencer – music programming (tracks 1-8, 10-12)
Bridgette Blades – backing vocals (tracks 2, 5, 11-12)
Alexandra Brown – backing vocals (tracks 2, 5, 11-12)
Vann Johnson – backing vocals (tracks 2, 5, 11-12)
Samantha Smith – backing vocals (track 4)
Valerie Etienne – backing vocals (tracks 5, 7, 10)
Hazel Fernandez – backing vocals (tracks 5, 7, 10)
Audrey Martells – backing vocals (tracks 8)

Technical
Mike Spencer – producer (all tracks), engineer (tracks 1, 3, 5, 7-10, 12), audio mixing (all tracks)
Jay Kay – producer (2, 6, 8), artwork
Rick Pope – recording engineer (tracks 1, 3, 5, 8, 10, 12)
Reginald Dozier – recording engineer (tracks 7, 9)
Nick Ferrero – recording engineer (track 9)
Pablo Arraya – additional recording engineer (all tracks)
Richard Bignell – additional recording engineer (all tracks)
Tom Coyne – mastering
Charlie Lightening – photography

Charts

Weekly charts

Year-end charts

Certifications

References

External links
 

2005 albums
Jamiroquai albums